The year 1892 in art involved some significant events.

Events
 February – Claude Monet begins painting his Rouen Cathedral series
 c. February – Alfred Gilbert is commissioned to sculpt the tomb (with recumbent effigy) of Prince Albert Victor, Duke of Clarence, in the Albert Memorial Chapel of St George's Chapel, Windsor Castle, England; although not finished until 1928 it is substantially complete in 1898 as "the finest single example of late 19th-century sculpture in the British Isles"
 March – James McNeill Whistler stages his major retrospective exhibition, Nocturnes, Marines and Chevalet pieces at Goupil & Cie's London gallery, then moves to Paris
 April 4 – Munich Secession
 May – The Brotherhood of The Linked Ring is founded by Henry Peach Robinson in England to promote photography as a fine art
 November – "The Munch Affair": Adelsteen Normann, on behalf of the Union of Berlin Artists, invites Edvard Munch to stage a one-man exhibition. However, his paintings evoke bitter controversy and after one week the exhibition is closed; Munch's paintings are moved to the Equitable Palast
 Charles Rennie Mackintosh and Herbert MacNair are introduced to Margaret and Frances MacDonald in Glasgow
 Il Codice Magliabechiano, a 16th century collection of brief biographies and notes on the works of Italian artists by "Anonimo Gaddiano", is first published

Awards
Legion of Honour (France) – James McNeill Whistler

Works of art

Paintings

Ivan Aivazovsky – Brig "Mercury" Attacked by Two Turkish Ships
José Ferraz de Almeida Júnior – Leitura ("Reading")
John Henry Frederick Bacon – The Wedding Morning
Gustave Caillebotte
Nasturtiums
Portrait of the artist
Gustaf Cederström – Magnus Stenbock in Malmö
John Collier – Lilith
Thomas Eakins – The Concert Singer
James Ensor
Man of Sorrows (Koninklijk Museum voor Schone Kunsten, Antwerp)
The Skate
Paul Gauguin- **  Arearea l
Aha Oe Feii?
Fatata te Miti ("By the Sea")
Spirit of the Dead Watching
Te Fare
 we shall not go to the market today
When Will You Marry?
J. W. Godward
At The Garden Shrine, Pompeii
The Betrothed
Classical Beauty
Far Away Thoughts (two versions)
Leaning On The Balcony
The Playground
With Violets Wreathed And Robe Of Saffron Hue
Lydia Purdy Hess – Portrait of Miss E. H.
P. S. Krøyer – Summer Evening at Skagen. The Artist's Wife and Dog by the Shore
Sir Frederic Leighton – The Garden of the Hesperides
Isaac Levitan – Evening Bells
Maximilien Luce – Côte de la citadelle
Juan Luna
The Parisian Life
Peuple et Rois
Jacek Malczewski
Christmas Eve in Siberia
Self-portrait with palette
Francis Davis Millet
An Autumn Idyll
Between Two Fires
Albert Joseph Moore – Lightning and Light
Edvard Munch
Evening on Karl Johan
Inger in Black and Violet
August Strindberg
 John Singer Sargent – Mrs. Hugh Hammersley
Henri de Toulouse-Lautrec
La Goulue arriving at the Moulin Rouge (Museum of Modern Art, New York)
Le Lit
At the Moulin Rouge
At the Moulin Rouge: two women waltzing
Quadrille at the Moulin Rouge
Posters for Aristide Bruant
Henry Scott Tuke – Mrs Florence Humphris
Félix Vallotton
Bathers on a Summer Evening (1892–93)
The Invalid
Édouard Vuillard – Self-Portrait

Sculptures

Charles E. Barber – United States Barber coinage
Jean-Léon Gérôme – Bellona
Felix Görling – Statue of Alexander von Humboldt (Chicago)
Richard Henry Park – John Plankinton statue
Jeronimo Sunol – Statue of Christopher Columbus (Central Park, New York City)

Other
The Diamond Trellis Egg is presented to Maria Feodorovna by her husband Alexander III of Russia

Births
29 February – Augusta Savage, African American sculptor (died 1962).
5 March - Dean Cornwell, American illustrator, painter, and muralist (died 1960)
14 March – Charles Wheeler, English sculptor (died 1974).
12 May – Colin Gill, English war artist, muralist and portrait painter (died 1940).
14 May – Marjorie Watson-Williams, English painter (died 1984).
19 May – Wilhelm Heise, German painter (died 1965).
30 May – Fernando Amorsolo, Filipino painter (died 1972).
31 May – Michel Kikoine, painter (died 1968).
30 June – Wilhelm Schnarrenberger, German painter (died 1966).
15 July – Walter Benjamin, German philosopher, "comparatists" and art critic (died 1940).
July 19 – Suzanne Malherbe, French illustrator and designer (died 1972).
July 24 – Marcel Gromaire, French painter (died 1971).
7 August – Einar Forseth, Swedish artist.
16 August – Otto Messmer, American animator (died 1983).
11 October – Anton Räderscheidt, German painter (died 1970).
16 October – Adolf Ziegler, German painter and politician (died 1959).
23 November – Romain de Tirtoff, Russian-born French artist and designer (died 1990).
7 December – Stuart Davis, American painter (died 1964).
Undated
Lang Jingshan, Chinese photographer (died 1995).
Veljko Stanojević, Serbian painter (died 1967).

Deaths
January 11 – Amanda Sidwall, Swedish painter and illustrator (born 1844)
January 14 – Alexander Jackson Davis, American architect and illustrator (born 1803)
January 15 – Randolph Rogers, American neoclassical sculptor (born 1825)
January 20 – Louis Pierre Henriquel-Dupont, French engraver (born 1797)
February 27 – Louis Vuitton, French designer (born 1821)
March 3 – Fedor Solntsev, Russian painter and art historian (born 1801)
March 21 – Anthon van Rappard, Dutch painter (born 1858)
June 1 – Louis Janmot, French painter (born 1814)
October 5 – Albert Aurier, French Symbolist poet, art critic and painter (born 1865)
October 7 – Thomas Woolner, English sculptor and poet (born 1825)
October 29 – William Harnett, Irish American trompe l'oeil painter (born 1848)
Undated
John Lewis Brown, French painter (born 1829)
Walter Hood Fitch, British botanical artist (born 1817)
Serafino De Tivoli, Italian painter (born 1826)

References

 
Years of the 19th century in art
1890s in art